An accusation is a statement by one person asserting that another person or entity has done something improper. The person who makes the accusation is an accuser, while the subject against whom it is made is the accused. Whether a statement is interpreted as an accusation relies on the social environment in which it is made:

An accusation can be made in private or in public, to the accused person alone, or to other people with or without the knowledge of the accused person. An accuser can make an accusation with or without evidence; the accusation can be entirely speculative, and can even be a false accusation, made out of malice, for the purpose of harming the reputation of the accused.

Perceptions
The perceived strength of an accusation is affected by the trustworthiness of the accuser. For example, in investigative journalism:

Accusations and public relations
In journalism, the reporting of an accusation is commonly balanced with an effort to obtain a response to the accusation by the accused person or entity:

There is therefore usually an opportunity for the subject of an accusation to respond to it. An accusation made against a corporation is often treated as a public relations event, in which a business is accused of wrongdoing in order to influence its behavior.

Criminal accusations
A criminal accusation is a formal accusation made by the state against an individual or enterprise. In addition to the normal elements of an accusation, a criminal accusation specifies that the wrongdoing on the part of the accused constitutes a violation of the law.

See also
 Allegation
 False accusation
 Indictment
 Information (formal criminal charge)

References

Broad-concept articles
Communication design
Criminal law
Personal life
Public relations
Social concepts